Chitra Mudgal  (born 10 December 1943) is an Indian Writer and one of the leading literary figures of modern Hindi literature.

She is the first Indian woman to receive the coveted Vyas Samman for her novel Avaan.

In 2019 she was awarded India's highest literary award, the Sahitya Akademi, for her novel Post Box No. 203, Naalasopara.

Personal life
Chitra Mudgal was born in Chennai on 10 December 1943. She received her M.A. in Hindi Literature from the SNDT Women's University. She married Awadh Narain Mudgal, former Editor of "Sarika", against her father's wish.

Literary work
Her novel 'Aavaan', portrayed the lives and times of the trade union movement when nearly 300,000 workers spearheaded by Datta Samant went on a year long strike of the Mumbai textile mills, which finally saw the collapse of the city's trademark industry. This work has been unanimously acknowledged by the critics as a masterpiece of literary work and stands as a classic novel in Hindi Literature.

The plot of her novel Aavaan was conceived following the murder of a committed trade union leader, Shankar Guha Niyogi. His murder was in fact followed by the murder of another popular unionist of Bombay, Datta Samant. Subsequently, another labour leader of Madhya Pradesh, from Maihar, was killed.

The murder of Datta Samant, who was her guide and philosopher, "shattered her" and became the bases of her novel Aavaan.

Awards
 2000 – Indu Sharma International Katha Samman for novel 'Aavaan'
 2003 – Vyas Sammaan by the Birla Foundation for her novel 'Aavaan'
 2018 – Sahitya Akademi Award for her novel "Postbox no.203 Nalasopara".

References

External links
 Writer without a pause, pen for a cause 
 Streeshakti –  The Parallel Force

1943 births
20th-century Indian women writers
20th-century Indian writers
20th-century Indian politicians
Living people
Hindi-language writers
SNDT Women's University alumni
Women writers from Tamil Nadu
Writers from Chennai
Indian women novelists
21st-century Indian novelists
21st-century Indian women writers
21st-century Indian politicians
Indian women trade unionists
Trade unionists from Tamil Nadu
Novelists from Tamil Nadu
Women in Tamil Nadu politics
Recipients of the Sahitya Akademi Award in Hindi
21st-century Indian women politicians